Âṣkuňu is a language of Afghanistan spoken by the Ashkun people – also known as the Âṣkun, Ashkun, Askina, Saňu, Sainu, Yeshkun, Wamas, or Grâmsaňâ – from the region of the central Pech Valley around Wâmâ  and in some eastern tributary valleys of the upper Alingar River in Afghanistan's Nuristan Province. Other major places where the language of Ashkun is spoken are Nuristan Province, Pech Valley in Wama District, eastern side of the Lower Alingar Valley in Nurgaram and Duab districts, Malil wa Mushfa, Titin, Kolatan and Bajagal valleys.

It is classified as a member of the Nuristani sub-family of the Indo-Iranian languages.

Demographics
Current status: There are currently about 40,000 ethnic people who speak this language. None of the mentioned people are monolinguals. Illiteracy rate among this group of people is around 5%-15%.

Location: Part of Nuristan and adjacent areas along the Kabul river and its tributaries in the mountain region that encompasses northeastern Afghanistan, northern Pakistan, and northwestern India

Dialects/Varieties: Ashuruviri (Kolata, Titin Bajaygul), Gramsukraviri, Suruviri (Wamai). Not intelligible with the other Nuristani languages.

Dialects
Âṣkuňu is spoken in several dialects in southwestern Nuristan. The main body of the Âṣkuňu tribe inhabits the Askugal (Kolata, Majegal) Valley, which drains southwestward into the Alingar River. These people speak a dialect which differs from that of their neighbors in the Titin Valley to the south (cf. Morgenstierne 1929). The inhabitants of the Bajaygol Valley further up the Alingar are reported to speak a third dialect. Across a mountain ridge to the east of the Âṣkuňu two tribal groups, each with its own dialect, center on the villages of (Wama) and Gramsaragram (Acanu) off the Pec River. Other dialects in which this language is spoken in are Ashuruveri, Gramsukraviri, Kolata, Suruviri, Titin Bajaygul, and Wamai.

Orthography 
The Ashkun language is strictly passed on orally and has no written resources that can be traced.

Vocabulary

Pronouns

Numbers
 āc̣
 du
 tra
 ćātā
 põć
 ṣo
 sot
 oṣṭ
 no
 dos

Words
Hello is “Salam”
How are you is “Kaigases”

Notes

Literature
 Cardona, G. (2014). Indo-Iranian languages. Encyclopædia Britannica.
 Grierson, G. A. (1927). Report on a Linguistic Mission to Afghanistan. By Georg Morgenstierne. Oslo: H. Aschehoug and Co.(W. Nygaard). 10× 6, 98 pp. and 3 maps. Price 2s. 9d. Journal of the Royal Asiatic Society of Great Britain & Ireland (New Series), 59(02), 368–375.
 Grierson, G. A. (1927). [Review of Report on a Linguistic Mission to Afghanistan]. Journal of the Royal Asiatic Society of Great Britain and Ireland, (2), 368–375.  
 Klimburg, M. (1999). The Kafirs of the Hindu Kush: art and society of the Waigal and Ashkun Kafirs (Vol. 1). Franz Steiner Verlag.
 Morgenstierne, G. (1929). The language of the Ashkun Kafirs. Aschehoug.
 Turner, R. L. (1932). The Language of the Ashkun Kafirs. By G. Morgenstierne. Extract from Norsk Tidsshrift for Sprogvidenskap, Bind ii, 1929. pp. 192–289. Journal of the Royal Asiatic Society of Great Britain & Ireland (New Series), 64(01), 173–175.
 Voegelin, C. F., & Voegelin, F. M.. (1965). Languages of the World: Indo-European Fascicle One. Anthropological Linguistics, 7(8), 1–294. 
 Where on earth do they speak Ashkun? (2015, November 15). Retrieved February 11, 2016, from http://www.verbix.com/maps/language/Ashkun.html

External links 
 Endangered Languages profile for Askunu
 
 
 
 
 

Nuristani languages
Nuristani languages of Afghanistan